Rhys Thomas "Rusty" Gabe (22 June 1880 – 15 September 1967) born as Rees Thomas Gape, was a Welsh rugby union player who played club rugby for Llanelli, London Welsh and Cardiff and gained 24 caps for Wales, mainly as a centre.

Rugby career
Born in Llangennech, Gabe started his rugby career with Llangennech before making his debut with Llanelli at the age of seventeen. In 1901 he moved to London to study at Borough Road Training College and joined London Welsh, where he was moved to centre. After qualifying as a mathematics teacher, he took a teaching post in Cardiff and joined the Cardiff club, where he formed a devastating centre combination with Gwyn Nicholls for both club and country. He played for Cardiff between 1902–03 and 1909–10, captaining the club in the 1907–08 season. He scored 51 tries for Cardiff in 115 appearances.

Gabe won his first cap for Wales against Ireland in 1901, playing on the left wing. His 24 caps for Wales included the famous Match of the Century, the 1905 victory against New Zealand. Gabe would go on to captain Wales in the 1907 match against Ireland, and toured Australasia with the British Isles team of 1904. He played in all four test matches, including the three victories over Australia.

Gabe was an impressive try scorer and scored 11 tries during his Welsh career. In his first game against England in 1902 he scored a memorable try when John Strand-Jones deceived the entire English pack and passed the ball to Gabe. With only the English full back Gamlin to beat, Gabe raced to the try line and rounded Gamlin but took a heavy blow to his solar plexus. Gabe managed to carry on, cross the line, score the try, only then passing out.

His most remarkable try was probably one scored against England at Bristol in 1908. The match was played in thick fog, and Gabe and his teammate Percy Bush found a loose ball outside England's 25. Gabe won the tussle for the ball and set off in the direction of the line, while Bush ran off in the opposite direction to confuse the opposition. Eventually the referee and the other players arrived at the line to find Gabe waiting with the ball.

Gabe retired in 1908, but still appeared occasionally for Cardiff. He was a fine club cricketer and played occasionally for Glamorgan. He also captained Radyr Golf Club, and played at Cardiff Golf Club well into his eighties. He died in Cardiff in 1967.

International games played
Wales
  1902, 1903, 1904, 1905, 1906, 1907, 1908
  1908
  1901, 1902, 1903, 1904, 1905, 1906, 1907, 1908
  1905
  1902, 1903, 1904, 1905, 1907, 1908
  1906

British Isles
  1904, 1904, 1904
  1904

Bibliography

Further reading
Gareth Hughes (1983) One hundred years of scarlet (Llanelli Rugby Football Club)

References

1880 births
1967 deaths
British & Irish Lions rugby union players from Wales
Cardiff RFC players
Glamorgan County RFC players
Llanelli RFC players
Llangennech RFC players
London Welsh RFC players
Rugby union centres
Rugby union players from Carmarthenshire
Wales international rugby union players
Wales rugby union captains
Welsh rugby union players